Brian Stow Crossley (5 October 1926 – 8 September 2012) was an English-born actor and director and drama tutor, who after starting his career in his native country, emigrated to Australia. He appeared in and directed numerous roles in theatre and on television over a career spanning more than 50 years, including directing straight theatre, musicals, opera and operetta.

Biography 
  
He was born in Shipley in West Yorkshire, England to engineering draughtsman Harry Crossley and Minnie Stow. He attended Birmingham College of Speech and Drama and performed as part of Birmingham Repertory Theatre, he appeared in a production of Gilbert and Sullivan's Patience and in 1950 was invited to join the chorus for the D'Oyly Carte Opera Company, playing a variety of small roles. In 1952 he played in Gay's the Word on the West End, he emigrated to Australia in 1954, where he moved to Melbourne to join the Union Theatre Repertory Company. He toured Australia and New Zealand in 1956 with the J.C. Williamson Gilbert and Sullivan Opera Company, but with the arrival of television he turned his attention to the screen.

He appeared in a variety of television programs, including Homicide, Division 4 and Consider Your Verdict, as well as directing for serial The Box. His most successful role was on children's series Adventure Island, where he played Mrs Flower Potts from 1967 to 1972.  
 
During this period he also directed for the stage; his first directing project was Christoph Willibald Gluck's Orfeo ed Euridice for the Victorian State Opera; he subsequently directed Benjamin Britten's The Rape of Lucretia, Domenico Cimarosa's The Secret Marriage and Franz Joseph Haydn's L'infedeltà delusa and collaborated extensively with Dennis Olsen. He directed a wide variety of Gilbert and Sullivan operettas and in 1973 was appointed a director of the National Theatre's Opera School. He moved to the Darling Downs Institute of Advanced Education in Queensland around 1982.

Crossley died in Melbourne on 8 September 2012, aged 85.

Television

Actor

Director

Producer

Theatre (selected)

References

External links 

1926 births
2012 deaths
20th-century Australian male actors
Australian television directors
Australian male musical theatre actors
Australian male television actors
People from Shipley, West Yorkshire
Australian theatre directors
British emigrants to Australia